The requirement to wear bicycle helmets in the United States varies by jurisdiction and by age of the cyclist, for example 21 states and the District of Columbia have statewide mandatory helmet laws for children. 29 US states have no statewide law, and 13 of these states have no such laws in any lower-level jurisdiction either.

Importance
States began to adopt laws on wearing helmets for bicycle riding in 1987. There are a total of 22 state laws for bicycle helmets and 201 local laws. Each year about 2% of motor vehicle crash deaths are bicyclists. In a majority of bicyclist deaths, the most serious injuries are to the head. Helmet use has been estimated to reduce the odds of head injury by 50%, and the odds of head, face, or neck injury by 33%.

Protection
Helmet laws reduce fatalities from bicycle accidents by about 15% in the long run. There is no evidence that shows laws requiring children to wear helmets increases adult use. Through 2000, existing helmet laws have saved 130 lives.

Effects
The state of New York reported that since it had introduced its second helmet law in 1994 for riders under 14, the annual rate of cyclists hospitalized from bicycle-related traumatic brain injuries fell from 464 in 1990 to 209 in 1995. There is no way to determine exactly what proportion of the improvement was due to helmet laws, since there is no data on improvements to bicycle facility safety, rider education or total miles ridden in those years, and helmet promotion campaigns by Safe Kids Worldwide and others were active in the state.

Helmet recalls
By law, all helmets sold in the U.S. must meet standards set by the Consumer Products Safety Commission (CPSC). There were two helmet recalls in the year 2000. A helmet made by Rand International of Farmingdale, NY was voluntarily recalled and involved 70,000 helmets known as "L.A. Cruisin' Bike Helmets" in child, youth and adult sizes. The CPSC's press release for the recall was, "These helmets fail impact testing and labeling required under CPSC’s Safety Standard for Bicycle Helmets violating the Consumer Product Safety Act. Riders wearing these helmets are not properly protected from falls and could suffer severe head injuries…" The other helmet was a girl's helmet with decals reading "Hearts and Flowers."  It was voluntarily recalled by Cycle Express Inc., of New York, NY, who had sold about 9,000 of them. The CPSC released a similar press release statement, “These helmets fail impact testing and labeling required under CPSC’s Safety Standard for Bicycle Helmets violating the Consumer Product Safety Act. Riders wearing these helmets are not adequately protected from falls and could suffer severe head injuries or death…”

Laws by jurisdiction

See also
 Bicycle law in the United States
 Bicycle helmet laws
 Bicycle helmet laws by country

References

United States
Cycling in the United States